Asociacion Deportiva Limonense also known as ASODELI, was a Costa Rican football team, which played for more than 20 years at the Costa Rican top level, the Primera Division.

It was based in Limón, their home stadium Estadio Juan Gobán and nicknamed "Caribeños" (Caribbeans).

History
The football club was founded on 10 July 1961 and made its debut in the Primera División on 19 April 1964.

By 2009, playing on Segunda Division level, the team entered in a financial crisis and the shareholders agreed to lease the team to local businessman Carlos Howden Pascal, renaming the team to Limón F.C.

Stadium

The Juan Gobán Stadium is a soccer stadium located in Limón, head of the province of the same name, on the Caribbean coast of Costa Rica.

In February 2010, a synthetic turf measuring 91 meters long by 72 meters wide was installed.  The following reforms included the construction of boxes, press areas, complete remodeling of the dressing rooms and installation of artificial lighting.

In September 2010, the Juan Gobán stadium was reopened after a series of renovations that involved a year and a half of work, in addition to an investment of close to $1 million, 800 thousand dollars.

Among the novelties is the expansion of the dressing room area from two to four, a weight room, a doping room, laundry, four sodas, two offices, the installation of 20 restrooms and a VIP area for 220 people.  In addition to the total replacement of the roof of the shadow grandstand.

In general, the capacity of the redoubt was expanded to 2,349 people.  The stadium was home to the Limon F.C.  of the First Division of Costa Rica from 2010 to 2020.

Honours
 Primera División de Costa Rica
Runner up (1): 1981
 Segunda División de Costa Rica
Champion (2): 1971, 1998

See also
Limón F.C.
Limón Black Star

References

External links
 El reto de Rivers – Nación 

1961 establishments in Costa Rica
Defunct football clubs in Costa Rica
Association football clubs disestablished in 2009